41 for Freedom refers to the US Navy Fleet Ballistic Missile (FBM) submarines from the , , , , and es. All of these submarines were commissioned 1959–1967, as the goal was to create a credible, survivable sea-based deterrent as quickly as possible. These submarines were nicknamed "41 for Freedom" once the goal of 41 nuclear-powered ballistic missile submarines (SSBNs) was established in the early 1960s. The 1972 SALT I Treaty limited the number of American submarine-launched ballistic missile tubes to 656, based on the total missile tubes of the forty-one submarines, in line with the treaty's goal of limiting strategic nuclear weapons to the number already existing.

Overview 
The "41 for Freedom" nuclear-powered ballistic missile submarines (SSBNs) were armed with submarine-launched ballistic missiles (SLBMs) to create a deterrent force against the threat of nuclear war with any foreign power threatening the United States during the Cold War.

The United States had deployed nuclear weapons aboard submarines for the purpose of deterrence since 1959, using the SSM-N-8 Regulus cruise missile. However, this was intended to act merely as a stop-gap, as the Regulus was limited both by its size – the greatest number of missiles capable of being taken to sea was five aboard  – range and speed, as well as the fact that the submarine was required to surface to launch a missile. The intention was that the main element of the US Navy's contribution to the strategic nuclear deterrent be a ballistic missile armed submarine.

The US Navy created a new submarine classification for these boats: SSBN. These 41 were superseded by the submarines of the  1980–1992.

, operating as a SEAL platform in her later years, was decommissioned on 2 April 2002, the last boat of the original "41 for Freedom" submarines in commission, and the oldest submarine in the US Navy. Almost 37 years old, she held the record for the longest service lifetime of any nuclear-powered submarine.

Submarines by Class 

* Preserved as training vessels

Gallery

See also 
Regulus missile submarines
Nuclear navy
Nuclear warfare
Nuclear strategy
Vertical launching system

References

External links 
From the Federation of American Scientists:

 
 

Submarine units and formations
Submarines of the United States Navy
Ballistic missile submarines
Cold War submarine-launched ballistic missiles of the United States